Yonggung Gok clan was one of the Korean clans. Their Bon-gwan was in Yecheon County, North Gyeongsang Province. According to the research in 2000, the number of Yonggung Gok clan was 148. Their founder was  who was naturalized from Tang dynasty.  served as the government post named pyeongchal in Goryeo during Taejo of Goryeo’s reign.

See also 
 Korean clan names of foreign origin

References

External links 
 

 
Korean clan names of Chinese origin